Ivanna Israilova (born 4 February 1986) is an Uzbekistani-born Russian retired tennis player.

In her career, Israilova won two doubles titles on the ITF Women's Circuit. On 7 June 2004, she reached her best singles ranking of world number 417. On 9 February 2004, she peaked at number 313 in the WTA doubles rankings. Playing for Uzbekistan at the Fed Cup, she has a win–loss record of 12–14. Israilova retirement from tennis 2012.

ITF Circuit finals

Singles (0–3)

Doubles (2-2)

Fed Cup participation

Singles

Doubles

References

External links

 
 
 

1986 births
Living people
Sportspeople from Tashkent
Uzbekistani female tennis players
Russian female tennis players
Uzbekistani people of Russian descent
Uzbekistani emigrants to Russia
Competitors at the 2002 Asian Games
Asian Games competitors for Uzbekistan